Gachie is a locality in Kihara ward, Kiambaa constituency, Kiambu county. It is named after one of its first settlers and a son of Kihara. Gachie is located in Kenya's Kiambu County approximately 12 km from the city of Nairobi and Nyari Estate.

In 2013, Gachie and Kihara areas were enjoying a steady demand for property. Another research paper by the University of Nairobi Digital Repository said "The area (Gachie) which was previously rural in character has changed and is now acquiring an urban character".

References 

Populated places in Nairobi Province